"Heavy Hearted" is a song by Australian indie pop band the Jungle Giants, released on 8 July 2019 as the lead single from the band's fourth studio album Love Signs (2021). It was written, produced, recorded and engineered by lead singer, songwriter, and guitarist Sam Hales Remixes were released in October 2019.

The single was certified gold in Australia in January 2020.

At the AIR Awards of 2020, the remixes EP won Best Independent Dance or Electronica Album or EP.

At the Queensland Music Awards of 2020, "Heavy Hearted" won Song of the Year and Pop Song of the Year.

Background
Upon release, The Jungle Giants' frontman Sam Hales told Triple J, "It's probably the deepest and furthest I' ve gone into engineering, recording and playing almost everything. It's got pop sensibility but it's a big play-around with sounds. It was such a pleasure to make." Hales added "'Heavy Hearted' has been with me as an me as an instrumental track for so long that I'd forgotten the title a bunch of times and nearly lost it in my sessions. That bass line and beat would always creep its way back into my mind though. It's been a sweet journey watching the track grow and it just feels right to share it."

Reception
Alex Gallagher from Music Feeds said "The groovy, primarily electronic track builds around a syncopated piano line and has a big collage of sounds behind it – while maintaining a kind of big pop energy to the whole thing."

Track listings
Digital download
 "Heavy Hearted" – 4:16

Limited Edition 7" vinyl (AMP0011)
 "Heavy Hearted" 	
 "Heavy Hearted" 

Digital download
 "Heavy Hearted"  – 5:27
 "Heavy Hearted"  – 5:34
 "Heavy Hearted"  – 6:41
 "Heavy Hearted"  – 5:53

Charts

Weekly charts

Year-end charts

Certifications

References

2019 songs
2019 singles
The Jungle Giants songs